Viluthiyur is a village in the Papanasam taluk of Thanjavur district, Tamil Nadu, India.

Demographics 

As per the 2001 census, Viluthiyur had a total population of 950 with 481 males and 469 females. The sex ratio was 975. The literacy rate was 71.36.

References 

 

Villages in Thanjavur district